Emanuele Sella (born 9 January 1981) is an Italian former road racing cyclist, who competed professionally between 2004 and 2015 for the ,  and  teams.

Doping
In out-of-competition control testing, on 23 July 2008, Vicenza-born Sella was found to test positive for CERA, the third-generation EPO according to La Gazzetta dello Sport. Sella confirmed that he had used EPO when he was called to testify in front of the Italian National Olympic Committee (CONI) on 8 August 2008. This resulted in his suspension for a year, starting 19 August 2008.

Career achievements

Major results

2003
 1st Trofeo Alcide Degasperi
2004
 1st Trofeo Cittá di Castelfidardo
 1st Stage 11 Giro d'Italia
2005
 1st Overall Brixia Tour
1st Points classification
1st Stage 2b
 3rd Gran Premio di Lugano
 10th Overall Giro d'Italia
2007
 1st Stage 3 Brixia Tour
2008
 1st Stage 5 Settimana internazionale di Coppi e Bartali
 6th Overall Giro d'Italia
1st  Mountains classification
1st Stages 14, 15 & 20
2009
 3rd Overall Cinturó de l'Empordà
1st Stage 3
2010
 2nd Grand Prix of Aargau Canton
 3rd Overall Tour of Austria
2011
 1st  Overall Settimana internazionale di Coppi e Bartali
1st Stages 1b & 3
 2nd Overall Giro dell'Appennino
 2nd Classica Sarda Olbia-Pantogia
 3rd Tour de Langkawi
2012
 1st Coppa Ugo Agostoni
 1st Gran Premio Industria e Commercio di Prato
2013
 1st  Mountains classification, Route du Sud
 10th Giro dell'Emilia

Grand Tour general classification results timeline

; Voided results = struck through.

References

External links

Italian Giro d'Italia stage winners
Italian male cyclists
Italian sportspeople in doping cases
Sportspeople from Vicenza
1981 births
Living people
Doping cases in cycling
Cyclists from the Province of Vicenza
21st-century Italian people